Mammillaria laui is a species of cactus in the genus Mammillaria, native to Tamaulipas state in Mexico. A number of subspecies were described, occurring along an elevation gradient; these are no longer accepted. It is listed as Critically Endangered (CR) in the wild. As Mammillaria lauii it has gained the Royal Horticultural Society's Award of Garden Merit.

References

laui
Endemic flora of Mexico
Flora of Tamaulipas
Plants described in 1979